Chiclana de Segura is a city located in the province of Jaén, Spain.

Twin towns
 Chiclana de la Frontera, Spain
 Chiusa Sclafani, Italy

References

Municipalities in the Province of Jaén (Spain)